Kahal Kadosh Beth Elohim (also known as K. K. Beth Elohim, or more simply Congregation Beth Elohim) is a Reform Synagogue located in Charleston, South Carolina. Having founded the congregation in 1749, it was later claimed to be the first Reform synagogue located in the United States, the current 1841 synagogue was built by enslaved African descendants owned by David Lopez Jr, a prominent slaveowner and proponent of the Confederate States of America, after the original synagogue was destroyed in a fire in 1838. It is one of the oldest Jewish congregations in the United States.  The congregation is nationally significant as the place where ideas resembling Reform Judaism were first evinced.  It meets in an architecturally significant 1840 Greek Revival synagogue located at 90 Hasell (pronounced as if it were spelled Hazel) Street in Charleston, South Carolina. It was designed by Cyrus L. Warner.

History

Before 1830 Kahal Kodesh Beth Elohim (KKBE) was a place of worship in Charleston, South Carolina for Spanish and Portuguese Jews using Portuguese rituals as done in Portugal before the Spanish and Portuguese inquisitions, it later adopted a reformed religious ritual, after reabsorbing a splinter group originally led by Isaac Harby. In 1824 the Reformed Society of the Israelites was founded by Portuguese Jews. It adopted ideas from the European Reform movement, and itself contributed ideas to the later, widespread American Reform movement, but was also quite different form either of them, with its own unique Reform prayer-book, the first in America.

The founding members of the KKBE were Sephardi Jews of Spanish and Portuguese, who arrived into Charleston from London, England to work in mercantile freight and the slave trade. While the congregation is sometimes considered to be the originator of Reform Judaism in the United States, that movement was established by European immigrants mostly from Germany later on.

Rabbi Burton Padoll, who served as the synagogue's rabbi during the 1960s, was an outspoken activist for the rights of African-Americans. Rabbi Padoll was forced to resign as rabbi after prominent members of the congregation objected to his support for the civil rights movement.

Synagogue

The present Greek Revival building is the second oldest synagogue building, and the oldest in continuous use, in the United States; in addition, it has the oldest continually operating Jewish cemetery in the United States.   It is a single story brick building, set on a raised granite foundation. The brick is stuccoed and painted white, and is marked in manner to resemble stone blocks.  The front has a full Greek temple front, with fluted Doric columns supporting a gabled pediment.  The building was added to the National Register of Historic Places on April 4, 1978, as Kahal Kadosh Beth Elohim Synagogue and was designated a National Historic Landmark on June 19, 1980. The Coming Street Cemetery, owned by the Congregation, is listed separately on the National Register of Historic Places.

In 2021, a monument was installed with an inscription at the site of the synagogue, to commemorate the forced human labor extracted from Black Africans owned by industrialist and slaveowner David Lopez Jr in the construction of the site; In acknowledging the past injustice, Rabbi Stephanie Alexander says "We're being honest and transparent about what has enabled us to come together and has enabled us to come to this space."

Inside the synagogue, there is a mural which includes a Jewish Confederate soldier sitting with a broken sword, an artistic depiction of the Lost Cause of the Confederacy.

See also
List of National Historic Landmarks in South Carolina
National Register of Historic Places listings in Charleston, South Carolina
Oldest synagogues in the United States
Touro Synagogue
Billy Simmons

References

External links

Kahal Kadosh Beth Elohim website
Jewish Historical Society of South Carolina website
Kahal Kadosh Beth Elohim Synagogue, Charleston County (90 Hasell St., Charleston), at South Carolina Department of Archives and History
Historic Charleston's Religious and Community Buildings, a National Park Service Discover Our Shared Heritage Travel Itinerary

Buildings and structures in Charleston, South Carolina
Founding members of the Union for Reform Judaism
German-American culture in South Carolina
German-Jewish culture in the United States
Greek Revival architecture in South Carolina
Greek Revival synagogues
Jewish-American history
National Historic Landmarks in South Carolina
National Register of Historic Places in Charleston, South Carolina
Portuguese-Jewish culture in the United States
Synagogues on the National Register of Historic Places in South Carolina
Reform synagogues in South Carolina
Synagogues completed in 1840
Religious organizations established in 1749
Sephardi Jewish culture in South Carolina
Sephardi Reform Judaism
Spanish-Jewish culture in the United States
Slavery in the United States